A by-election for the seat of Charlestown in the New South Wales Legislative Assembly was held on 25 October 2014. The by-election was triggered by the resignation of Liberal-turned-independent MP Andrew Cornwell, who won the seat at the 2011 election with a 43.8 percent primary and 59.9 percent two-party vote.

The last New South Wales by-election saw a 26-point two-party swing to Labor.

Background
Charlestown, located in the traditional Labor heartland of the Hunter Region, was held by Labor without interruption from its creation in 1971 until Cornwell won the seat on a swing of 25.2 points, and 59.9 percent of the two-party preferred vote—on paper, turning it into a safe Liberal seat in one stroke.  Cornwell's victory was all the more remarkable since the Liberals hadn't even put up a candidate in the 2007 election.

On 6 August 2014, a hearing of the New South Wales Independent Commission Against Corruption (ICAC) revealed that Cornwell had received $10,000 in illegal donations from Newcastle Lord Mayor Jeff McCloy.  Following this revelation, Cornwell resigned from the Liberal Party and moved to the crossbench as an independent pending the result of the inquiry.  Cornwell also admitted to the ICAC that his wife had received $10,120 from developer Hilton Grugeon, ostensibly for a painting given to the developer in 2010 which was worth much less. The money was used to pay Cornwell's PAYG tax.

On 8 August 2014, Cornwell announced that would not re-nominate for Charlestown at the next NSW election. Less than a week later, on 12 August, Cornwell announced his immediate resignation.

Dates

Candidates
The nine candidates in ballot paper order are as follows:

The Liberals declined to contest the by-election, and also declined to field a candidate in the by-election in Newcastle held on the same day.  NSW Liberal director Tony Nutt stated that the Liberals would not contest either by-election "as an explicit act of atonement" for the revelations, and Premier Mike Baird said that the Liberals didn't deserve to contest the seats while they were "getting (their) house in order." According to ABC election analyst Antony Green, it was the first known occasion of a sitting government in NSW opting not to contest by-elections in seats that it previously held.

Results

Andrew Cornwell ( / ) resigned.

See also
Electoral results for the district of Charlestown
List of New South Wales state by-elections

References

External links
2014 Charlestown state by-election: Antony Green ABC
2014 Charlestown state by-election: NSW electoral commission

2014 elections in Australia
New South Wales state by-elections
2010s in New South Wales